Bernard Tchoullouyan (12 April 1953 — 7 January 2019) was a French judoka. He won a world title in 1981 and an Olympic bronze medal in 1980. He died on 7 January 2019, at the age of 65.

References

External links

 

1953 births
2019 deaths
Sportspeople from Marseille
Olympic judoka of France
Judoka at the 1980 Summer Olympics
Olympic bronze medalists for France
Olympic medalists in judo
French people of Armenian descent
Ethnic Armenian sportspeople
Medalists at the 1980 Summer Olympics
French male judoka
Chevaliers of the Légion d'honneur